is a passenger railway station located in the city of Himeji, Hyōgo Prefecture, Japan, operated by West Japan Railway Company (JR West).

Lines

Station layout
The station consists of one elevated island platform with the station building underneath. The station is unattended.

Platforms

Adjacent stations

|-
!colspan=5|West Japan Railway Company

History
Kyōguchi Station opened on February 18, 1898.  With the privatization of the Japan National Railways (JNR) on April 1, 1987, the station came under the aegis of the West Japan Railway Company.

Passenger statistics
In fiscal 2016, the station was used by an average of 1034 passengers daily.

Surrounding area
 Himeji City Joto Elementary School
 Himeji City Toko Junior High School
 Junshin Gakuin Junior and Senior High School
 Himeji Chamber of Commerce
 Himeji City Cultural Convention Center (Acrier Himeji)
 Hyogo Prefectural Harima Himeji General Medical Center

See also
List of railway stations in Japan

References

External links

  

Railway stations in Himeji
Bantan Line
Railway stations in Japan opened in 1898